Gonzalo Sánchez (1883 - death date unknown) was a Cuban baseball catcher in the Cuban League and Negro leagues. He played from 1902 to 1911 with several ballclubs, including Almendares, Club Fé, the All Cubans, the Cuban Stars (West), and the Habana club. He was elected to the Cuban Baseball Hall of Fame in 1949.

References

External links

1883 births
Year of death missing
Cuban League players
Cuban baseball players
All Cubans players
Almendares (baseball) players
Club Fé players
Cuban Stars (West) players
Habana players
Matanzas players